Thomas Nörber (19 December 1846 in Waldstetten – 27 July 1920 in Freiburg im Breisgau) was a German Roman Catholic clergyman. From 1898 until his death he served as Archbishop of Freiburg.

Sources

Archbishops of Freiburg
1920 deaths
1846 births
People from Neckar-Odenwald-Kreis